The Andersons Cove Formation is a formation cropping out in Newfoundland, Canada.

Ediacaran Newfoundland and Labrador
Geologic formations of Canada